The Northern Corridor Economic Region (NCER) is a development plan encompassing the four northwestern states of Malaysia, namely Perlis, Penang, Kedah and Perak. It was launched in 2007 by the federal government with an aim to transform the region into a sustainable and socio-economically balanced region by 2025. The Northern Corridor Implementation Authority (NCIA) is the statutory body responsible to establishing the NCER's direction, policies and strategies.

Background and history
In an effort to reduce regional imbalances and provide equitable economic growth across the country, the government established
five economic regions during the Ninth Malaysian Plan.
NCER was formed in 2007 to leverage on the various economic
and social advantages of selected areas in the four northern states
of Peninsular Malaysia - Kedah, Perlis, Perak and Penang.
NCIA was established as the body tasked to oversee, plan and
execute economic and social development strategies in the NCER
by focusing on three priority sectors: Agriculture, Manufacturing
and Services.

In 2014, the district of Manjung, Perak, was included in NCER; and
this was followed by the rest of Perak in 2016. The northern states
that form NCER remain as the country’s most ideal agricultural
location with consistent tropical weather as well as vast and fertile
land. All the four states have consistently enjoyed economic and
political prosperity. The region is strategically located, bordering
Thailand and facing the Straits of Malacca. It has the potential
to be a world-class trade destination by leveraging on strong
relationships with Sumatra and Thailand. The region’s border
towns such as Pengkalan Hulu-Betong (of Yala Province), Padang
Besar, Bukit Kayu Hitam-Sadao and Durian Burung-Ban Prakop
(of Songkhla) are gateway towns between Malaysia and Thailand
that hold limitless potential for economic and social expansion.

Perlis, Penang, Kedah, and northern Perak (comprising the districts of Hulu Perak, Kerian, Kuala Kangsar and Larut, Matang and Selama) combine to form 7 percent of Malaysia's land area, but contributed over 20 percent to the country's GDP, 60 percent of agricultural land, 30 percent of tourism income, and 45 percent of exports in 2011, according to NCIA chief executive Redza Rafiq. 

The NCER blueprint was formulated by Sime Darby Berhad. The plan calls for investments totaling RM117 billion over 18 years from 2007 to 2025. Implementation of the plan is divided into three phases. The first phase (2007–2012) involved securing anchor investors and constructing priority infrastructure. The second phase (2012–2020) aims to broaden and deepen private sector involvement, while the final phase (2020–2025) is to achieve regional market leadership through sustainable market-led growth.

The plan targets five core economic sectors of the region: agriculture, manufacturing, tourism, logistics, and education and human capital. Penang is a key manufacturing hub in the country and is home to manufacturing plants operated by Dell, Intel and AMD. Penang and the island of Langkawi are well-known tourist destinations in Malaysia; the NCER plans to double tourist receipts and triple tourist expenditure by 2020. The plan will also promote Penang Port as a trans-shipment centre.

Achievements
Among the key initiatives of the NCER was the construction of the Sultan Abdul Halim Muadzam Shah Bridge (or Penang Second Bridge) which opened to traffic in March 2014.

NCIA claims to have created more than 50,000 jobs as of 2015 since the NCER's inception.

References

External links

Development Corridors in Malaysia
2007 establishments in Malaysia
Perak
Penang
Perlis
Kedah
Prime Minister's Department (Malaysia)